The Deccan Chargers (DC) were a franchise cricket team based in Hyderabad, India, that competed in the Indian Premier League (IPL), a professional Twenty20 cricket (T20) league in India. They were one of the eight teams that competed in the inaugural 2008 Indian Premier League. The team was captained by V. V. S. Laxman and coached by Robin Singh.

Despite being one of the favourites to win the inaugural IPL, they finished at the bottom of the table, winning only two games out of fourteen.

After the 2008 season, the he team management sacked the entire administration associated with the tournament in that year. The captain and coach were also replaced.

Background 
The Deccan Chargers were one of the most expensive teams of the Indian Premier League and were considered to be one of the stronger sides.

Squad 

 Players with international caps are listed in bold.

Season overview 

On 20 April, the Deccan Chargers started their IPL campaign with a five wicket loss against the Kolkata Knight Riders.

On 22 April, the Chargers suffered a defeat at the hands of the Delhi Daredevils.

On 24 April, the Deccan Chargers lost their match against the Rajasthan Royals, despite Andrew Symonds scoring a century.

On 27 April, the Deccan Chargers recorded their first win, with a 10 wicket victory over the Mumbai Indians. Adam Gilchrist, who scored a century, was awarded player of the match.

On May 1, Andrew Symonds, who was one of the most expensive players in the auction, withdrew from the rest of the season because of international duty. On the same day, the Chargers lost to Kings XI Punjab by 7 wickets. The Kings XI won the toss and decided to bowl, restricting DC to 164 runs. Rohit Sharma and VVS Laxman played significant innings. The Kings XI chased the total with 7 wickets to spare.

On May 6, the DC secured their second win when they defeated the Chennai Super Kings by 7 wickets. DC won the toss and elected to bowl, restricting CSK to 144 runs. Gilchrist was awarded player of the match.

On May 13, it was announced that VVS Laxman would not play the rest of the matches due to an injury, and Adam Gilchrist would take over the captaincy.

In their last match of the season on 27 May, the DC lost to the Chennai Super Kings by 7 wickets.

The team finished last on the points table with two wins, and failed to qualify for the playoffs.

References 

2008 Indian Premier League